Franklin Rudolf Collbohm (January 31, 1907 – February 12, 1990) was an American aviation engineer.

Biography 

He was born on January 31, 1907, in New York City.

He died on February 12, 1990.

Education 

He studied engineering at the University of Wisconsin.

Personal life 

He was married to Katherine Collbohm and had three children.

Career 

He started his career as a test pilot for Douglas Aircraft.

He is most notable for being the founder of the RAND Corporation.

He has also collaborated with Paul Baran for the development of networking infrastructure.

Awards 

He has received the Defense Department's Distinguished Public Service Medal and also the U.S. Air Force’s Exceptional Service Award.

See also

 RAND Corporation

References

External links 
 RAND Corporation site
 

American business executives
American engineers
1907 births
1990 deaths